Edward Southard (born October 1, 1946) is an American politician. He is a former member of the South Carolina House of Representatives from the 100th District, serving from 2010 until 2017. He is a member of the Republican party.

References

Living people
1946 births
Republican Party members of the South Carolina House of Representatives
People from Habersham County, Georgia
21st-century American politicians